Lesnoy (masculine), Lesnaya (feminine), or Lesnoye (neuter) may refer to:

Places
Lesnoy District, a district of Tver Oblast, Russia
Lesnoy Urban Settlement, a municipal formation which the Work Settlement of Lesnoy in Pushkinsky District of Moscow Oblast, Russia is incorporated as
Lesnoye Urban Settlement, a municipal formation which the Urban-Type Settlement of Lesnoy in Verkhnekamsky District of Kirov Oblast, Russia is incorporated as
Lesnoy, Russia (Lesnaya, Lesnoye), several inhabited localities in Russia
Lesnoy, alternative name of Meşəli, Khojali, Azerbaijan
Lesnoy, Belarus, the town in Minsk region of Belarus

Other uses
Lesnoy (surname)
3482 Lesnaya, a minor planet
Lesnaya (Saint Petersburg Metro), a station of the St. Petersburg Metro, St. Petersburg, Russia